Bobsleigh at the 1968 Winter Olympics consisted of two events, at L'Alpe d'Huez.  The competition took place between 8 and 11 February 1968.

Medal summary

Medal table

Five countries won medals in Grenoble, with Italy leading the medal table, winning both gold medals. West Germany won its first medal in bobsleigh, while Romania's bronze medal was its first, and as of 2010, only, Winter Olympic medal.

Events

There was a tie for first place in the two-man event. Despite initially ruling that both teams would be awarded the gold medals, the judges awarded the sole gold to the Italian team based on their fastest single heat time.

Participating NOCs

Eleven nations participated in bobsleigh at the 1968 Games. West Germany made their Olympic bobsleigh debut, in their first games sending athletes separate from a unified German team.

References

External links
Wallechinsky, David and Jaime Loucky (2009). "Bobsleigh". In The Complete Book of the Winter Olympics: 2010 Edition. London: Aurum Press Limited.

 
1968
1968 Winter Olympics events
1968 in bobsleigh